Moïse Kabaku Mutshail is a Congolese diplomat and is the current Ambassador Extraordinary and Plenipotentiary of the Democratic Republic of the Congo to the Russian Federation, presenting his Letter of Credence to then-President of Russia Vladimir Putin on 3 February 2006. He held this post until 2010, being replaced by Ali Rashidi Moïse.

See also 
Democratic Republic of the Congo–Russia relations

References 

Democratic Republic of the Congo diplomats
Year of birth missing (living people)
Living people
Ambassadors of the Democratic Republic of the Congo to Russia
Ambassadors of the Democratic Republic of the Congo to Ukraine